Sir Felix John Morgan Brunner, 3rd Baronet (13 October 1897 – 2 November 1982) was a British Liberal Party politician and business owner. He was the maternal uncle of Katharine, Duchess of Kent.

Biography
The son of Sir John Brunner, 2nd Baronet, he studied at Cheltenham College and Trinity College, Oxford. During World War I, he served as a lieutenant in the Royal Field Artillery.

In 1926, Brunner married Elizabeth Irving, an actress, the granddaughter of Sir Henry Irving. In 1937 they bought Greys Court in Oxfordshire, and donated the house to the National Trust in 1969 but continued to live there.

Brunner followed in a family tradition by standing for election for the Liberal Party: in Hulme in 1924, Chippenham in 1929, and Northwich in 1945, but was never elected to Parliament. He was elected to Henley Rural District Council, and served as its chairman from 1954 to 1957. He was also President of the Liberal Party in 1962/3.

Brunner was also a supporter of the Open Spaces Society, chairing it from 1958 to 1970.

Brunner's children include John Henry Kilian, now the fourth baronet, and Hugo, a former Lord-Lieutenant of Oxfordshire.

References

1897 births
1982 deaths
Alumni of Trinity College, Oxford
Baronets in the Baronetage of the United Kingdom
Councillors in Oxfordshire
People educated at Cheltenham College
Presidents of the Liberal Party (UK)
Royal Field Artillery officers
Liberal Party (UK) parliamentary candidates